The 2005 Allianz Suisse Open Gstaad was a men's tennis tournament played on outdoor clay courts at the Roy Emerson Arena in Gstaad in Switzerland and was part of the International Series of the 2005 ATP Tour. It was the 60th edition of the tournament and was held from July 4 through July 10, 2004.

Finals

Singles

 Gastón Gaudio defeated  Stanislas Wawrinka 6–4, 6–4
 It was Gaudio's 4th title of the year and the 7th of his career.

Doubles

 František Čermák /  Leoš Friedl defeated  Michael Kohlmann /  Rainer Schüttler 7–6(8–6), 7–6(13–11)
 It was Čermák's 5th title of the year and the 10th of his career. It was Friedl's 5th title of the year and the 10th of his career.

External links
 Official website 
 ATP tournament profile

Allianz Suisse Open Gstaad
Swiss Open (tennis)
2005 Allianz Suisse Open Gstaad

it:Swiss Open Gstaad 2004